Gnesau is a town in the district of Feldkirchen in the Austrian state of Carinthia.

Geography
Gnesau lies in the upper Gurk valley in the Gurktal Alps.

The Gurk runs from northwest to southeast through the municipality. Right tributaries are the Haidenbach and the Kirchergrabenbach; left tributaries are the Görzbach and the Peiningerbach.

Neighboring municipalities

References

Cities and towns in Feldkirchen District